Abdoliyeh-ye Gharbi Rural District is a rural district (dehestan) in the Central District of Ramshir County, Khuzestan Province, Iran. At the 2006 census, its population was 7,035, in 1,192 families.  The rural district has 52 villages.

References 

Rural Districts of Khuzestan Province
Ramshir County